The Jason Russell House is a historic house in Arlington, Massachusetts, the site of the bloodiest fighting on the first day of the American Revolutionary War, April 19, 1775 (the Battle of Lexington and Concord). The house was purchased in 1923 by the Arlington Historical Society which restored it in 1926, and now operates it as a museum from mid-April through the end of October, together with the adjoining Smith Museum, built in 1981 to house changing exhibitions of life in Arlington.

History
About 1740, Jason Russell (1716–1775), a relatively prosperous farmer, constructed the house on pasture land he inherited in 1738. To have the front facing south, in the New England tradition, he placed the north side angled toward the Concord Road (now Massachusetts Avenue). The house is a typical New England farmhouse with five windows across the front, a door in the center and a large chimney in the middle of a pitched roof. There is some evidence that components in the hall (or kitchen) and its chamber above, as well as the garret, were salvaged from Grandfather Jason's original structure of 1680. The hall and parlor of the house, with their chambers and the garret, are essentially unchanged today, although in 1814 a porch (or vestibule) was added to the front door, and further extensions were subsequently added to the sides around 1863. Inside the central part are four rooms: to the left of the entry are the kitchen and children's chamber (above), and to the right, the parlor and parlor chamber. The kitchen ceiling retains its original whitewash and sponge painting decorative surface treatment. The outside walls may have been plastered originally, but in 1924, when the house was restored, wood sheathing was installed.

Robert Nylander proposed in 1964 that the house was built in two stages; however, research conducted in 2012 by the Dendrochronology Laboratory at Oxford University confirms that the home was erected during a single campaign between 1740 and 1750. The Oxford study also revealed that many of the timbers used in the house were made from lumber cut in 1684–85 or earlier and was probably salvaged from an older building on the property.

 On April 19, 1775, the house and its surrounding yard was the site of the bloodiest conflict of the first battle in the Revolutionary War, resulting in more colonial troop deaths than anywhere else along the battle road. As the British troops marched back towards Boston, heavy fighting occurred along their route through Arlington (then Menotomy). Brigadier General Hugh Percy gave orders to clear every dwelling to eliminate snipers, and houses along the way were ransacked and set afire by the retreating British. The running battle continued to Jason Russell's house, where Russell was joined by men from Beverly, Danvers, Lynn, Salem, Dedham, and Needham at his house.

The battle at the Jason Russell House occurred late in the day, around five PM. Light infantry and grenadiers from the detachment which engaged earlier at Lexington and Concord marched toward Boston along the Concord Road. They had been met earlier in Lexington by a brigade led by Lord Percy that brought up the rear and provided strong flanking parties. The Americans kept up incessant fire from behind stone walls and other places of shelter as the British retreated.

These skirmishes erupted into a full-fledged battle at the Jason Russell House. A company of minute-men under the command of Gen. Gideon Foster, along with several other companies of minute-men and militia, had left Danvers earlier. All reached Menotomy before the British. Many of them went into a walled enclosure near the Jason Russell House where they planned to intercept the retreating soldiers. Despite being warned to watch for a flank-guard, by Israel Hutchinson, one of their company captains, they focused on the main body of British as it passed. When the party flanking the Concord Road to the south surprised them, the Americans fled to the Jason Russell House.

Jason Russell was 59 and lame. At noon, he had started with his wife and children to seek safety at the George Prentiss house higher up on the hill, but after proceeding part way he sent them on alone and returned to his house. A nearby neighbor, Ammi Cutter, advised him to seek safety, but Russell refused, reportedly saying "An Englishman's house is his castle." Cutter himself was nearly killed by fire from an advance flanking party. Stumbling and falling between mill logs as bullets hit their bark around him, he was thought dead and the British passed him by.

Russell was outside his house and joined the minute-men as they fled toward it. Being old and slow, he was in the rear and was shot twice as he reached his own doorway and then stabbed eleven times with bayonets. The British rushed into the house, killing everyone they could see. Eight minute-men made it to the basement and survived by pointing their guns up the stairs. When Jason's wife returned, she found her husband and all of the dead laid side by side in the kitchen.  The house itself was riddled with bullet holes, many of them still visible. The blood stains on the floor were still visible when it was replaced in 1863.

Jason Russell and eleven others were buried in one grave, without coffins.  A plain obelisk of New Hampshire granite now stands above the grave.  It is reported that Capt. William Adams, who lived nearby, brought a sheet from his house saying he could not bear to have his neighbor buried before his eyes without a winding sheet.

The inscription on the monument reads:

Erected by the Inhabitants of West Cambridge, A.D. 1848, over the common grave of Jason Russell, Jason Winship, Jabez Wyman and nine others, who were slain in this town by the British Troops on their retreat from the Battles of Lexington and Concord, April 19th, 1775. Being among the first to lay down their lives in the struggle for American Independence.

The nine others, forgotten at the time the monument was erected, have since been identified as: John Bacon, Amos Mills, Jonathan Parker, Nathan Chamberlain of Needham, William Flint, Thomas Hadley, Abednego Ramsdell of Lynn, Elias Haven of Dedham and Benjamin Pierce of Salem.

Jason Russell's estate was settled in 1776. His house and 117 acres of land were divided between Noah, his only son left at home, and his widow, Elizabeth. She received the 17 acres the house was standing on together with half the house, "Libberty to ues the oven when wanted" and additional privileges of use, including space in the barn. Noah received the other half of the house, half the barn and some lands. Other children got other parts of the estate. Elizabeth Russell lived in her northerly rooms until the eleventh of August 1786 when she died aged 65.

See also
 National Register of Historic Places listings in Arlington, Massachusetts

Notes

References
 Cutter, Benjamin and William R. (1880). History of the Town of Arlington, Massachusetts. Boston: David Clapp & Son.
 Nylander, Robert Harrington (1964). "Jason Russell and His House in Menotomy,". Old Time New England, LV(2)
 Smith, Samuel Abbot (1864). West Cambridge on the Nineteenth of April, 1775. Boston: Alfred Mudge & Son.

External links

Arlington Historical Society page on the house

Houses completed in 1740
Historic house museums in Massachusetts
Houses on the National Register of Historic Places in Arlington, Massachusetts
American Revolutionary War sites in Massachusetts
Museums in Middlesex County, Massachusetts
Houses in Arlington, Massachusetts
American Revolutionary War museums in Massachusetts
Individually listed contributing properties to historic districts on the National Register in Massachusetts
1740 establishments in Massachusetts